The Aero Synergie J300 Joker is a French ultralight aircraft that was designed and produced by Sauper/ALMS and later by Aero Synergie. The aircraft was supplied as a kit for amateur construction and also as a complete ready-to-fly aircraft.

Design and development
The aircraft was designed to comply with the Fédération Aéronautique Internationale microlight rules. It features a strut-braced high-wing, a two seats in side-by-side configuration enclosed cockpit, tricycle landing gear or conventional landing gear and a single engine in tractor configuration.

The aircraft is made from welded steel tubing, covered in doped aircraft fabric. Its  span wing employs dual parallel struts. The standard engine fitted is the  Rotax 912UL four-stroke powerplant, with the  Rotax 912ULS optional.

Originally produced by Sauper/ALMS, the design was later manufactured by Aero Synergie. Production was halted circa 2011, although parts were still available in 2012.

Operational history
Popular in Europe and Africa as a trainer, it also found use as a personal aircraft due to its simple construction and ease of handling.

Specifications (J300)

References

External links

1990s French ultralight aircraft
Homebuilt aircraft
Single-engined tractor aircraft
J300
High-wing aircraft